George Monroe Beebe (October 28, 1836 – March 1, 1927) was an American lawyer and politician who served two terms as a U.S. Representative from New York from 1875 to 1879.

Biography
Born in New Vernon, New York, Beebe was the son of Primitive Baptist minister Gilbert Beebe and Pheobe Ann Cunningham Beebe. He attended the common schools, and Walkill Academy, Middletown, New York. He studied law and graduated from the Albany Law School in 1857. In 1861 he married Cornelia Foster of Monticello, New York.

Career
Beebe was admitted to the bar in 1857 and commenced practice in Monticello, New York.
He moved to Peoria, Illinois, in 1857 and became editor of the Central Illinois Democrat. He moved to Troy, Doniphan County, Kansas Territory, in 1858; and continued the practice of law, and served as member of the Territorial council in 1858 and 1859.
He was appointed by President James Buchanan as secretary of the Territory in 1859 and was Acting Governor in 1860 and 1861.

Beebe moved to St. Joseph, Missouri, in 1861 and to Virginia City, Nevada, in 1863, continuing the practice of law. He was an unsuccessful candidate for associate judge of the State supreme court in 1865 and returned to Monticello, New York. He became editor of the Republican Watchman in 1866. An unsuccessful candidate for the State senate in 1871, he was a member of the New York State Assembly (Sullivan Co.) in 1873 and 1874. Commissioned by Governor Dix as chief of artillery with the rank of colonel in the Fifth Division, National Guard of New York, in 1873, he resigned in 1874 to enter Congress.

Elected as a Democrat to the Forty-fourth and Forty-fifth Congresses Beebe was U. S. Representative for the fourteenth district from  March 4, 1875, to March 3, 1879. He served as chairman of the Committee on Expenditures in the Department of the Navy (Forty-fourth Congress), and was on the Committee on Mines and Mining (Forty-fifth Congress). An unsuccessful candidate for reelection in 1878 to the Forty-sixth Congress, he resumed his former newspaper pursuits.

A delegate to the Democratic National Conventions in 1876, 1880, and 1892, Beebe also served as member of the State court of claims from 1883 until 1900. He stayed in Monticello until 1892 when he moved to Ellenville, New York. He retired from active business pursuits in 1900.

Death
Beebe died in Ellenville, New York, on March 1, 1927 (age 90 years, 124 days). He is interred at Woodlawn Cemetery, New Windsor, New York.

References

External links

Article from the Times Herald-Record, March 8, 2003 https://web.archive.org/web/20140408220353/http://history.tomrue.net/lodge532/hx/beebe.htm

1836 births
1927 deaths
Albany Law School alumni
Democratic Party members of the United States House of Representatives from New York (state)
Democratic Party members of the New York State Assembly
New York (state) lawyers
People from Monticello, New York
19th-century American lawyers
Politicians from Orange County, New York
Kansas Territory officials